Astrapotheriidae is an extinct family of herbivorous South American land mammals that lived from the Late Eocene (Mustersan SALMA) to the Middle Miocene (Laventan SALMA) . The most derived of the astrapotherians, they were also the largest and most specialized mammals in the Tertiary of South America. There are two sister taxa: Eoastrapostylopidae and Trigonostylopidae.

Around 1900, Argentine paleontologist Florentino Ameghino described eight Colhuehuapian (Early Miocene) species from specimens he found south of Lake Colhué Huapi in Patagonia and grouped them into three genera: Parastrapotherium, Astrapotherium, and Astrapothericulus. It was obvious to Ameghino that these species represented a great diversity, ranging in size from a peccary to a rhinoceros, but his description was based entirely on fragmentary and not always comparable dental remains. Other expeditions to Patagonia have subsequently recovered considerably more complete materials.

Genera
Most genera have been found in Patagonia and adjacent areas in Argentina and Chile; whereas members of Uruguaytheriinae have been found further north: Xenastrapotherium (Late Oligocene-Middle Miocene of northern South America), Granastrapotherium (Middle Miocene of Colombia), Uruguaytherium (uncertain age, from Uruguay).

 Incertae sedis
 Parastrapotherium 
 Antarctodon 
 Astrapodon 
 Comahuetherium 
 Liarthrus 
 Maddenia 
 Subfamily Albertogaudryinae 
 Albertogaudrya 
 Astraponotus 
 Subfamily Astrapotheriinae
 Astrapothericulus 
 Astrapotherium 
 Scaglia 
 Subfamily Uruguaytheriinae
 Uruguaytherium 
 Granastrapotherium 
 Xenastrapotherium 
 Hilarcotherium

Notes

References

External links
  Astrapotheriidae occurrences distribution map
 . Retrieved 9 March 2013.

Meridiungulata
Eocene first appearances
Miocene extinctions
Prehistoric mammal families